The 1832 United States presidential election in Missouri took place between November 2 and December 5, 1832, as part of the 1832 United States presidential election. Voters chose four representatives, or electors to the Electoral College, who voted for President and Vice President.

Missouri voted unanimously for the Democratic Party candidate, Andrew Jackson.

Results

See also
 United States presidential elections in Missouri

References

Missouri
1832
1832 Missouri elections